Tilloglomus spectabilis is a species of beetle in the family Cerambycidae, the only species in the genus Tilloglomus.

References

Tillomorphini